Annie John, a novel written by Jamaica Kincaid in 1985, details the growth of a girl in Antigua, an island in the Caribbean. It covers issues as diverse as mother-daughter relationships, lesbianism, racism, clinical depression, poverty, education, and the struggle between medicine based on "scientific fact" and that based on "native superstitious know-how".

Plot summary

Annie John, the protagonist of the book, starts out as a young girl who worships her mother. She follows her everywhere, and is shocked and hurt when she learns that she must someday live in a different house from her mother. While her mother tries to teach her to become a lady, Annie is sent to a new school where she must prove herself intellectually and make new friends. She then falls in love with a girl by the name of Gwen. She promises Gwen that she will always love her. However, Annie later finds herself admiring and adoring a girl that she called the "Red Girl". She admires this girl in all aspects of her life. To Annie this girl is the meaning of freedom because she does not have to do any daily hygienic routines like the other girls.

Annie John is then moved to a higher class because of her intelligence. For this reason, Annie is drawn away from her best friend Gwen, while alienating herself from her mother and the other adults in her life. It later becomes clear that she also suffers from some kind of mental depression, which distances her from both her family and her friends. The book ends with her physically distancing herself away from all that she knows and loves by leaving home for nursing school in England.

Publication history
The book's chapters were originally published separately in The New Yorker, before being combined and published as the novel Annie John, the stories connected by Kincaid's use of Annie John as the narrator.

Major themes, symbolism, and style
Children growing apart from their parents while becoming adolescents is the major theme in the novel. Annie and her mother share common personalities, goals and even look exactly alike, though they grow apart through the narrative. Barbara Wiedemann writes that Kincaid's fiction is not specifically aimed at a young adult audience, but the readers will benefit from insight evident in Kincaid's description of coming of age.

Annie John has been noted to contain feminist views. Asked if the relationship between Annie and Gwen was meant to suggest "lesbian tendencies," Kincaid replied: "No…I think I am always surprised that people interpret it so literally." The relationship between Gwen and Annie is really a practicing relationship. It's about how things work. It's like learning to walk. Always there is the sense that they would go on to lead heterosexual lives. Whatever happened between them, homosexuality would not be a serious thing because it is just practicing" (Vorda 94).

In the story, the theme of colonialism is conveyed. England has colonized Antigua, and has reconstructed its society. This is seen when the reader is introduced to Miss George and Miss Edward, teachers at Annie's school, who are both named after English kings. Annie in return, strongly dislikes England for imposing its culture on Antigua.

Water is consistently used throughout the novel to depict the separation between Annie John and her mother. Symbolic references to water (including the sea, rain, and other forms) illustrate Annie's development from childhood to maturity. Near the start of the novel, the reader learns that Annie has both a normal baby bottle and one shaped like a boat - and that is only the beginning of her water-connected choices in life.

Kincaid's writing form is not in the traditional paragraph form, but run-on sentences and paragraphs with little fragments. Jan Hall, a writer for Salem Press Master Plots, Fourth Edition book states in an article about Annie John that "because the novel has no years, months, or dates the story has a sense of timelessness."

Connections to other works
There are clear echoes to themes and events from Kincaid's books Lucy and My Brother. My Brother is a non-fiction story, yet Annie John has some of the same events and facts placed in her own family as if Annie was Kincaid when she was younger. In My Brother, Kincaid's father had to walk after he ate because he had a bad digestive tract and heart, their family ate fish, bread, and butter, a six-year-old died in her mother's arm going over the same bridge that her father had recently walked on after eating, and the character of Miss Charlotte dies in both books. Lucy can be cited as a continuation of Annie John being that Annie John has moved off of her Caribbean island of Antigua and is starting a new life in England, even though Lucy is in America, because hypothetically Annie John will have to learn how to adjust to England. Jan Hall writes: "the themes of Annie John, Jamaica Kincaid’s first novel, are continued in Lucy (1990), a novel about a young woman’s experiences after leaving her Caribbean island."

Bibliography
Deborah E. Mistron. Understanding Jamaica Kincaid's Annie John: a student casebook to issues, sources, and historical documents. Greenwood Publishing Group, (1999)

References

1985 American novels
Antigua and Barbuda novels
African-American novels
Novels set in the Caribbean
Postcolonial literature
Novels by Jamaica Kincaid